The Ministry of Information and Communication or MIC was a ministry of the government of South Korea. Its headquarters are located in Jongno-gu, central Seoul. The last minister was Rho Jun-hyong, who began serving in March 2006. The ministry was dissolved on February 28, 2008 and combined with the former Korean Broadcasting Commission to form the Korea Communications Commission.

See also
Korea Post
Government of South Korea
Communications in South Korea

External links
Official English-language site

Government ministries of South Korea
Communications in South Korea
South Korea